Lanmeur is a commune in the Finistère department of Brittany in north-western France.

A hamlet in the commune called Kerouac has been established as the source of the name of the American writer Jack Kerouac. A street in Lanmeur has been named rue Jack Kerouac, and in March 2010 a first Jack Kerouac Festival took place in the commune.

Geography

Climate
Lanmeur has a oceanic climate (Köppen climate classification Cfb).

Population
Inhabitants of Lanmeur are called in French Lanmeuriens.

Breton language
In 2008, 15.26% of primary-school children attended bilingual schools, where Breton language is taught alongside French.

See also
Communes of the Finistère department

References

External links

Mayors of Finistère Association 

Communes of Finistère